A by-election was held for the New South Wales Legislative Assembly electorate of Canterbury on 10 January 1878 because Sir Henry Parkes was appointed Colonial Secretary forming the third Parkes ministry. Such ministerial by-elections were usually uncontested however on this occasion a poll was required in Canterbury and The Lachlan (James Watson). Both were comfortably re-elected. The other 5 ministers were re-elected unopposed.

Dates

Result

Sir Henry Parkes was appointed Colonial Secretary in the third Parkes ministry.

See also
Electoral results for the district of Canterbury
List of New South Wales state by-elections

References

1878 elections in Australia
New South Wales state by-elections
1870s in New South Wales